Sini Creek is a creek in Mersin Province, south Turkey.

The headwaters are in Toros Mountains to the south of Yarmasu village of Gülnar ilçe (district) where it is called Kazıklı Dere. In the northern part of Bozyazı ilçe the creek is named Gökdere. With tributaries in Dereköy and Kızılca it flows to south. After a waterfall around the ruins of a medieval-age monastery named Karamanastır, there are a number of artificial ponds and a low power (0.42 MW) hydroelectric plant. The creek discharges to Mediterranean Sea at  within Bozyazı ilçe center.

References

Rivers of Mersin Province
Rivers of Turkey
Bozyazı District